Léonard Forest (born 1928) is an Acadian filmmaker, poet and essayist. He was born in Massachusetts, United States, and grew up in Moncton, New Brunswick, Canada.

He has worked at the National Film Board from 1953 to 1980 and was involved in about 130 films, either as director, producer, script-writer.

Filmography

As director 
 La femme de ménage (1954)
 Les aboiteaux (1955) co-directed with Roger Blais
 Pêcheurs de Pomcoup (1956)
 Le monde des femmes (1956)
 Amitiés haïtiennes (1957)
 The whole world over (1957)
 Bonjou' soleil (1957)
 À la recherche de l'innocence (1964)
 Mémoire en fête (1964)
 Les Acadiens de la dispersion (1968)
 Acadie libre (1969)
 Out of silence (1970)
 La noce est pas finie (1971)
 Un soleil pas comme ailleurs (1972)
 Saint-Jean-sur-ailleurs (1980)
 Portrait: Gerald Squires of Newfoundland (1980)

As script writer 
 Les aboiteaux (1955)
 Les midinettes (1955)
 Pêcheurs de Pomcoup (1956)
 La vie est courte (1956)
 Amitiés haïtiennes (1957)
 Bonjou' soleil (1957)
 L'héritage (1960)
 À la recherche de l'innocence (1964)
 Mémoire en fête (1964)
 Les Acadiens de la dispersion (1968)
 Un soleil pas comme ailleurs (1972)
 Saint-Jean-sur-ailleurs (1980)
 Portrait: Gerald Squires of Newfoundland (1980)

As producer 
 Panoramique six films made for television (1957–1958)
including: 
 Les Brûlés
 Le maître du pérou
 Il était une guerre
 Les mains nettes
 Les 90 jours
 Le monde du travail five films (1957–1958)
 L'Urbanisme (1957–1958)
 La drave(1957–1958)
 Series «Profils et Paysages» (1958–1959)
including:
 Germaine Guèvremont, romancière
 John Lyman, peintre
 Félix Leclerc, troubadour
 Charles Forest, curé-fondateur
 Fred Barry, comédien
 Henri Gagnon, organiste
 Marius Barbeau, anthropologue
 Pierre Beaulieu, agriculteur
 Lionel Groulx, historien I
 Lionel Groulx, historien II
 Les Petites Sœurs, religieuses cloîtrées
 Georges Vanier, soldat, diplomate et gouverneur-général
 Édouard Simard, industriel I
 Édouard Simard, industriel II
 St-Denys Garneau, poète
 Wilfred Pelletier, musicien
 Alfred Desrochers, poète
 Cyrias Ouellet, homme de science
 La canne à pêche (1959)
 Normétal (1959)
 L'immigré (1959)
 La canne à pêche (1959)
 Au bout de ma rue (1960)
 L'héritage (1960)
 La misère des autres (1960)

Published works 
 Saisons antérieures poetry (1973) at Éditions d'Acadie
 Comme en Florence poetry (1980) was awarded the prix France-Acadie
 La jointure du temps essays (1998) at Éditions Perce-Neige, was awarded the Prix Champlain 1999
 Le pommier d'août poetry (2001) at Éditions Perce-Neige
 Les trois pianos children's book (2003) at Éditions Bouton d'or Acadie
 Ni queue ni tête children's book (2004) at Éditions Bouton d'or Acadie

Bibliography 
Josette Déléas, Léonard Forest ou le ragard pionnier, Centre d'études acadiennes, Moncton, 1998

References 

1928 births
20th-century Canadian poets
Canadian male poets
Canadian screenwriters in French
Canadian children's writers in French
Living people
Canadian poets in French
Writers from Moncton
National Film Board of Canada people
Acadian film
Acadian people
American male screenwriters
Canadian male essayists
20th-century Canadian essayists
20th-century Canadian male writers
Screenwriters from Massachusetts
Film directors from New Brunswick
American emigrants to Canada
Film producers from New Brunswick